Mauro Alberto Díaz (born 10 March 1991) is an Argentine professional footballer who plays as an attacking midfielder.

Early career

Díaz made his first team debut for River Plate on 21 September 2008 in a 3–1 away loss to San Martín de Tucumán.

Club career

FC Dallas

Díaz joined Major League Soccer side FC Dallas late in 2013, quickly emerging as a talented young playmaker for the club. He scored several goals in the first few weeks of the 2014 season and earned MLS's player of the month for his exploits in March 2014. However, injuries affected him the rest of the season, and he ended up starting only nine matches. In 2015, he started 24 games and scored eight goals with ten assists as Dallas were the runners up for the Supporters' Shield and advanced to the Western Conference Finals. The next year, Díaz helped Dallas win two trophies: the 2016 Lamar Hunt U.S. Open Cup and the 2016 Supporters' Shield. However, his 2016 season ended in the penultimate game of the regular season on 16 October when he tore the Achilles tendon on his right leg. He was later named to the 2016 MLS Best XI.

Shabab Al-Ahli Dubai
On July 3, 2018, it was announced that Diaz had joined UAE Pro-League side Shabab Al-Ahli for an undisclosed transfer fee.

Personal life
Diaz is the brother-in-law of both fellow Argentine footballer Ramiro Funes Mori and Mexican footballer Rogelio Funes Mori. Diaz holds a U.S. green card which qualifies him as a domestic player for MLS roster purposes.

Honors 
FC Dallas
 Lamar Hunt U.S. Open Cup: 2016
 Supporters' Shield: 2016

Individual
 Lamar Hunt U.S. Open Cup Player of the Tournament: 2016 
 MLS Best XI: 2016
 MLS All-Star: 2016

References

External links
 Argentine Primera statistics
 
FC Dallas profile

1991 births
Living people
Sportspeople from Entre Ríos Province
Argentine footballers
Argentine expatriate footballers
Argentina youth international footballers
Association football midfielders
Designated Players (MLS)
Club Atlético River Plate footballers
Unión Española footballers
FC Dallas players
Shabab Al-Ahli Club players
Estudiantes de La Plata footballers
Club Deportivo Palestino footballers
Chilean Primera División players
Argentine Primera División players
UAE Pro League players
Major League Soccer players
Major League Soccer All-Stars
Expatriate footballers in Chile
Expatriate soccer players in the United States
Expatriate footballers in the United Arab Emirates
Argentine expatriate sportspeople in Chile
Argentine expatriate sportspeople in the United States
Argentine expatriate sportspeople in the United Arab Emirates